Peter Willem Drost (born 25 February 1958) is a former freestyle swimmer from the Netherlands, who competed at the 1980 and 1984 Summer Olympics. His best individual result came in 1984, when he finished in seventh place (7:26.72) in the 4×200 m freestyle relay, alongside his younger brother Frank, Hans Kroes and Edsard Schlingemann. He is not related to Monique Drost, who is also a retired swimmer who competed at the 1980 Olympics.

References

1958 births
Living people
Olympic swimmers of the Netherlands
Dutch male freestyle swimmers
Dutch male butterfly swimmers
Swimmers at the 1980 Summer Olympics
Swimmers at the 1984 Summer Olympics
Sportspeople from Amersfoort